Old Texas is an unincorporated community in Monroe County, Alabama, United States.

History
A post office called Old Texas was established in 1857, and remained in operation until it was discontinued in 1866. The community was named by pioneers from eastern states who passed through here on their way to Texas, and decided instead to stay.

References

Unincorporated communities in Monroe County, Alabama
Unincorporated communities in Alabama
1857 establishments in Alabama